Pioneer, formerly News from Verona, is an American Christian music band. They come from Indianapolis, Indiana. The band started making music in 2008. Their membership is Chad Shirrell, Dalton Meyers, Dan Voris, and Dustin Jones, with former members being Josh Randolph and Nick Berry. The band released, an extended play as News from Verona, All I Know Is I Know Nothing, independently, in 2010. Their next release, a studio album, was released by Slospeak Records, Pioneer, in 2012. They released, a second extended play, Passive Aggression, Pt. 1, in 2015, with Slospeak Records.

Background
Pioneer, who formerly went by News from Verona, is a Christian music band from Indianapolis, Indiana. Their current members are lead vocalist and guitarist, Chad Shirrell, lead guitarist, Dalton Meyers, guitarist, Dustin Jones, and drummer, Dan Voris. Their former members are former front man lead vocalist and keyboardist, Josh Randolph, and bassist, Nick Berry.

Music history
The band commenced as a musical entity in 2008, with their first release, All I Know Is I Know Nothing, an extended play, that was independently released, on June 8, 2010. Their first studio album, Pioneer, was released on January 24, 2012, with Slospeak Records. This album had three singles released, where they charted on the Billboard magazine Christian Rock chart, while "Treason" and "Dream" peaked at No. 1 on the chart, "Lights" reached a peak position of No. 6. They released, an extended play, Passive Aggression, Pt. 1, with Slospeak Records, on May 12, 2015.

Members
Current members
 Chad Shirrell – lead vocals, guitar
 Dalton Meyers – lead guitar
 Dustin Jones – guitar
 Dan Voris – drums
Former members
 Josh Randolph – lead vocals (till 2013), keys (till 2013)
 Nick Berry – bass

Discography
Studio albums
 Pioneer (January 24, 2012, Slospeak)
EPs
 All I Know Is I Know Nothing (June 8, 2010, Independent, as News from Verona)
 Passive Aggression, Pt. 1 (May 12, 2015, Slospeak)
Singles

References

External links
 Official website

Musical groups from Indianapolis
2008 establishments in Indiana
Musical groups established in 2008